Pilosocereus fulvilanatus is a species of plant in the family Cactaceae. It is endemic to Brazil.  Its natural habitats are subtropical or tropical dry forests, subtropical or tropical dry shrubland, and rocky areas. It is threatened by habitat loss.

References

fulvilanatus
Cacti of South America
Endemic flora of Brazil
Vulnerable flora of South America
Taxonomy articles created by Polbot